Kentucky Route 686 (KY 686) is a  state highway around the city of Mount Sterling, Kentucky. The route begins at Kentucky Route 11 and U.S. Route 460 north of the city and goes counter-clockwise, ending at U.S. Route 60 east of downtown. The western portion of the bypass from KY 11 south of the city to US 460 north of the city was completed in late 1985 as a four-lane highway. East of the southern junction with US 460 to the eastern terminus at US 60, KY 686 is a  two-lane highway on a four-lane right-of-way and was completed in the early 2000s.

Route description
KY 686 begins at an intersection with US 460/KY 11 in the northern part of Mount Sterling, heading west on four-lane divided Indian Mound Drive. The road passes through business areas, curving to the south. The route intersects KY 713 before coming to a junction with US 60. Past US 60, KY 686 heads through residential areas with some businesses, turning to the east. The road intersects KY 11 again and passes more development in the southern part of Mount Sterling before coming to another junction with US 460. Following this intersection, the route heads northeast into agricultural areas and narrows into a two-lane undivided road, crossing KY 713 again. KY 686 curves to the north and passes through more rural areas before heading near residential and commercial development and ending at another intersection with US 60 to the east of Mount Sterling.

Major intersections

References

External links

0686
0686
Mount Sterling, Kentucky